The 1944 United States presidential election in Virginia took place on November 7, 1944, throughout the 48 contiguous states. Voters chose 11 representatives, or electors to the Electoral College, who voted for president and vice president.

Virginia voted for the Democratic nominee, incumbent President Franklin D. Roosevelt, over the Republican nominee, New York Governor Thomas E. Dewey. Roosevelt ultimately won the national election with 53.39% of the vote.

This was the last election until 2020 where the Democratic candidate won Virginia by a double-digit margin. It is also the last occasion the following county-equivalents have voted for a Democratic Presidential nominee: Augusta County, Mathews County, Northumberland County, Richmond County and Roanoke County. The independent city of Staunton would not vote Democratic again until Barack Obama in 2008.

Results

Results by county

References

Virginia
1944
1944 Virginia elections